Hyperrealism is a genre of painting and sculpture resembling a high-resolution photograph.  Hyperrealism is considered an advancement of photorealism by the methods used to create the resulting paintings or sculptures.  The term is primarily applied to an independent art movement and art style in the United States and Europe that has developed since the early 1970s. Carole Feuerman is the forerunner in the hyperrealism movement along with Duane Hanson and John De Andrea.

History
The art dealer Isy Brachot coined the French word hyperréalisme, meaning hyperrealism, as the title of a major exhibition and catalogue at his gallery in Brussels in 1973. Since then, hyperealisme has been used by European artists and dealers to apply to painters influenced by the photorealists. Among contemporary European hyperrealist painters we find Gottfried Helnwein, Willem van Veldhuizen and Tjalf Sparnaay, Roger Wittevrongel, as well as the French Pierre Barraya, Jacques Bodin, Ronald Bowen, François Bricq, Gérard Schlosser, Jacques Monory, Bernard Rancillac, Gilles Aillaud and Gérard Fromanger.

Early 21st century hyperrealism was founded on the aesthetic principles of photorealism.  American painter Denis Peterson, whose pioneering works are universally viewed as an offshoot of photorealism, first used "hyperrealism" to apply to the new movement and its splinter group of artists. Graham Thompson wrote "One demonstration of the way photography became assimilated into the art world is the success of photorealist painting in the late 1960s and early 1970s.  It is also called super-realism or hyper-realism and painters like Richard Estes, Denis Peterson, Audrey Flack, and Chuck Close often worked from photographic stills to create paintings that appeared to be photographs."

However, hyperrealism is contrasted with the literal approach found in traditional photorealist paintings of the late 20th century. Hyperrealist painters and sculptors use photographic images as a reference source from which to create a more definitive and detailed rendering, one that often, unlike photorealism, is narrative and emotive in its depictions. Strict Photorealist painters tended to imitate photographic images, omitting or abstracting certain finite detail to maintain a consistent over-all pictorial design.  They often omitted human emotion, political value, and narrative elements.  Since it evolved from pop art, the photorealistic style of painting was uniquely tight, precise, and sharply mechanical with an emphasis on mundane, everyday imagery.

Hyperrealism, although photographic in essence, often entails a softer, much more complex focus on the subject depicted, presenting it as a living, tangible object.  These objects and scenes in hyperrealism paintings and sculptures are meticulously detailed to create the illusion of a reality not seen in the original photo.  That is not to say they're surreal, as the illusion is a convincing depiction of (simulated) reality.  Textures, surfaces, lighting effects, and shadows appear clearer and more distinct than the reference photo or even the actual subject itself.

Hyperrealism has its roots in the philosophy of Jean Baudrillard, "the simulation of something which never really existed."  As such, hyperrealists create a false reality, a convincing illusion based on a simulation of reality, the digital photograph.  Hyperreal paintings and sculptures are an outgrowth of extremely high-resolution images produced by digital cameras and displayed on computers.  As photorealism emulated analog photography, hyperrealism uses digital imagery and expands on it to create a new sense of reality. Hyperrealistic paintings and sculptures confront the viewer with the illusion of manipulated high-resolution images, though more meticulous.

Style and methods

The hyperrealist style focuses much more of its emphasis on details and the subjects. Hyperreal paintings and sculptures are not strict interpretations of photographs, nor are they literal illustrations of a particular scene or subject. Instead, they use additional, often subtle, pictorial elements to create the illusion of a reality which in fact either does not exist or cannot be seen by the human eye. Furthermore, they may incorporate emotional, social, cultural and political thematic elements as an extension of the painted visual illusion; a distinct departure from the older and considerably more literal school of photorealism.

Hyperrealist painters and sculptors make allowances for some mechanical means of transferring images to the canvas or mold, including preliminary drawings or grisaille underpaintings and molds.  Photographic slide projections or multi media projectors are used to project images onto canvases and rudimentary techniques such as gridding may also be used to ensure accuracy. Sculptures utilize polyesters applied directly onto the human body or mold.  Hyperrealism requires a high level of technical prowess and virtuosity to simulate a false reality. As such, hyperrealism incorporates and often capitalizes upon photographic limitations such as depth of field, perspective and range of focus.  Anomalies found in digital images, such as fractalization, are also exploited to emphasize their digital origins by some hyperrealist painters, such as Chuck Close, Denis Peterson, Bert Monroy and Robert Bechtle.

Themes

Subject matter ranges from portraits, figurative art, still life, landscapes, cityscapes and narrative scenes. The more recent hyperrealist style is much more literal than photorealism as to exact pictorial detail with an emphasis on social, cultural or political themes.  This also is in stark contrast to the newer concurrent photorealism with its continued avoidance of photographic anomalies.  Hyperrealist painters at once simulate and improve upon precise photographic images to produce optically convincing visual illusions of reality, often in a social or cultural context.

Some hyperrealists have exposed totalitarian regimes and third world military governments through their narrative depictions of the legacy of hatred and intolerance. Denis Peterson and Gottfried Helnwein depicted political and cultural deviations of societal decadence in their work. Peterson's work focused on diasporas, genocides and refugees. Helnwein developed unconventionally narrative work that centered on past, present and future deviations of the holocaust. Provocative subjects include enigmatic imagery of genocides, their tragic aftermath and the ideological consequences.  Thematically, these controversial hyperreal artists aggressively confronted the corrupted human condition through narrative paintings as a phenomenological medium.  These lifelike paintings are an historical commentary on the grotesque mistreatment of human beings.

Hyperreal paintings and sculptures further create a tangible solidity and physical presence through subtle lighting and shading effects.  Shapes, forms and areas closest to the forefront of the image visually appear beyond the frontal plane of the canvas; and in the case of sculptures, details have more clarity than in nature. Hyperrealistic images are typically 10 to 20 times the size of the original photographic reference source, yet retain an extremely high resolution in color, precision and detail.  Many of the paintings are achieved with an airbrush, using acrylics, oils or a combination of both. Ron Mueck's lifelike sculptures are scaled much larger or smaller than life and finished in incredibly convincing detail through the meticulous use of polyester resins and multiple molds. Bert Monroy's digital images appear to be actual paintings taken from photographs, yet they are fully created on computers.

Hyperrealists

 Alison Van Pelt
 Andreas Orosz
 Antonio López
 Anthony Brunelli
 Arinze Stanley Egbe
 Audrey Flack
 Augusto Ferrer-Dalmau
 Ben Johnson
 Ben Schonzeit
 Bert Monroy
 Bertrand Meniel
 Boris Dragojevic
 CJ Hendry
 Carole Feuerman
 Charles Bell
 Chuck Close
 Claudio Bravo
 Clive Head
 David Kassan
 David Lynch
 David Parrish
 Davis Cone
 Denis Peterson
 Dennis Wojtkiewicz
 Dimitri Desiron
 Don Eddy
 Don Jacot
 Dragan Malesevic Tapi
 Duane Hanson
 Eric Dillman
 Eric Zener
 Carole A. Feuerman
 Fola David
 Franz Gertsch
 Frederic Gracia
 Gilles Paul Esnault
 Glennray Tutor
 Gottfried Helnwein
 Gus Heinze
 Hilo Chen
 Howard Kanovitz
 Hynek Martinec
 Ian Hornak
 István Sándorfi
 Jack Mendenhall
 Jerry Ott
 John Baeder
 John De Andrea
 John Kacere
 John Salt
 Jorge Melicio
 Joseph Canger
 José Ramón Muro
 Juan Francisco Casas
 Juan Gonzalez
 Kamalky Laureano
 Kelvin Okafor
 Ken Nwadiogbu
 Malcolm Morley
 Marilyn Minter
 Mark Jenkins
 Maurizio Cattelan
 Michal Ožibko
 Noah Creshevsky
 Oresegun Olumide
 Oscar Ukonu
 Otto Duecker
 Patricia Piccinini
 Patrick Chuka
 Paul John Wonner
 Paul Thek
 Peter Anton
 Peter Maier
 Ralph Goings
 Randy Dudley
 Raphaella Spence
 Richard Estes
 Richard McLean
 Robert Bechtle
 Robert Cottingham
 Robert Gniewek
 Robert Neffson
 Roberto Bernardi
 Robin Eley
 Rod Penner
 Ron Kleemann
 Ron Mueck
 Sebastian Krüger
 Taner Ceylan
 Terry Rodgers
 The Kid
 Tom Blackwell
 Tjalf Sparnaay
 Willem van Veldhuizen
 Yigal Ozeri
 Zharko Basheski

References

Further reading 
 
 World Hyperrealism Database - List of artists, exhibitions, critics, and theoretical texts

External links
 
 

Contemporary art movements
Modern art
20th century in art
21st century in art
Hyperrealism